Mouhamed Soueid (born 30 December 1991) is a Mauritanian professional footballer who plays as a midfielder for Al-Hudood SC in Iraq.

International career

International goals

References

External links
Player profile - ffrim

1991 births
Living people
Mauritanian footballers
Association football midfielders
FC Tevragh-Zeina players
Mauritania international footballers
2021 Africa Cup of Nations players